Myers-Hicks Place, a.k.a. Holly Hill Farm, is a historic house in Byhalia, Mississippi, USA.

Location
The house is located along Mississippi Highway 309 in Byhalia, a small town in Marshall County, Mississippi.

History
Martine Pickett Myers acquired the land in 1850. The one-story house was built five years later, in 1855. It was designed as a temple, in the Greek Revival architectural style.

Later, the house belonged to the Hicks family. The house was renamed in honor of their daughter, Annice E. Hicks. They converted a doorway into a window, added a kitchen in 1911, and later added a bathroom.

The house was acquired by Mr and Mrs Henry Hunt III in 1968. It still belonged to them in the 1980s.

Architectural significance
It has been listed on the National Register of Historic Places since March 7, 1983.

References

Houses completed in 1855
Greek Revival houses in Mississippi
Antebellum architecture
Houses on the National Register of Historic Places in Mississippi
National Register of Historic Places in Marshall County, Mississippi
1855 establishments in Mississippi